Oceana Publications Inc. was a legal publisher. It was founded in 1945. It was based in Dobbs Ferry, New York. Oxford University Press acquired the assets of the company in 2005.

References
Roberta Hershenson. World of Law is Oceana's Universe. The New York Times. 28 June 1987.
"Oceana Publications, Inc." Publications Clearing House Bulletin. American Association of Law Libraries. 1987. Volumes 1 and 2. Page 79 et seq. Google Books
"Oceana purchases Glanville Company". Library Journal. 1960. Volume 85. Issue 2. Page 1411. Google Books
"Oceana buys Glanville, Plans to Expand List" (1960) 177 Publishers Weekly 199 Google Books
(1966) 10 Library Resources & Technical Services 168 and 232 Google Books
"Oceana Opens Antiquarian Law Bookshop". (1972) 201 Publishers Weekly 33 Google Books
"Oceana Opens Rare Book Shop" (1972) 51 Michigan State Bar Journal 462 Google Books
"Second Annual Breakfast and Business Meeting" (1974) 3 Documents to the People: A Quarterly Journal of Government Information Practice and Perspective 15 Google Books: 
"Change in Administration at Oceana" and "Oceana Announces New Telephone Ordering Policy, New Web Site, and New E-mail Addresses". (1995) 27 American Association of Law Libraries Newsletter 348 Google Books
P F Cohen, "Oceana Publications" (1991) 11 Legal Reference Services Quarterly 113
"Another Legal Publisher Enters CD-ROM Publishing: Oceana Announces Plans" (1989) 21 American Association of Law Libraries Newsletter 78 Google Books
Betty Simnacher. "The Typsetter Connection". PC Magazine. 17 April 1984. 309 at 311 and 317.
Jennifer Steinhauer. "Philip F. Cohen, 87, Founder of Legal Publishing Company". The New York Times. 30 September 1998. The New York Times Biographical Service. New York Times and Arno Press. 1998. Volume 29. Page 1583. Google Books
"Philip F. Cohen 1911-1998" (1998) 29 The Law Librarian 180 Google Books
Alexander Peter Wales. "Cohen, Philip F" in Who is Who in Publishing. London. 1965. Page 46. Google Books
"Mr. Philip Cohen". The Law Librarian. 1983. Volumes 14 to 16. Page 129. Google Books
"Philip Cohen". Publishers Weekly. 1972. Volume 202. Part 2. Page 43. Google Books

External links 

"Important information about Oceana Online". Oxford University Press.
Publications of Oceana

Publishing companies established in 1948
Publishing companies of the United States
Companies based in Westchester County, New York